David Hrnčár (born 10 December 1997) is a Slovak professional footballer who currently plays for Beveren as a right winger, on loan from Slovan Bratislava.

Club career

ŠK Slovan Bratislava
Hrnčár made his Fortuna Liga debut for Slovan Bratislava against Zemplín Michalovce on 5 August 2018.

Loan at Beveren
On 19 January 2022, it was announced that Hrnčár will be loaned until June 2023 to Beveren of Belgian second division with options for permanent transfer. Hrnčár was to aid Beveren content for title and promotion and was set to wear jersey number 22.

International career
In March 2021, Hrnčár was recognised as an alternate in a national team nomination for three World Cup qualifiers by Štefan Tarkovič. Hrnčár entered the shortlisted 27-man squad in September 2022 replacing injured Ivan Schranz for four 2022–23 UEFA Nations League C fixtures. However, he failed to repeat the nomination for November friendlies or prospective national team players' training camp in December, only listed as an alternate.

Personal life
David's father, Norbert, was a former national player collecting 2 caps for Slovakia and currently manages Zemplín Michalovce.

Honours
Slovan Bratislava
Fortuna Liga: 2021–22

References

External links
 ŠK Slovan Bratislava official club profile
 
 Futbalnet profile
 Ligy.sk profile

1997 births
Living people
Sportspeople from Žilina
Slovak footballers
Association football midfielders
ŠK Slovan Bratislava players
FK Pohronie players
FC ViOn Zlaté Moravce players
Slovak Super Liga players
2. Liga (Slovakia) players
S.K. Beveren players
Slovak expatriate footballers
Slovak expatriate sportspeople in Belgium
Expatriate footballers in Belgium